Nadan Mahal (literally, "deliverance tomb") is the mausoleum of Shaikh Ibrahim Chishti, a saint and the first governor of Lucknow during the rule of the Mughal Emperor Akbar.

References

Mausoleums in Uttar Pradesh
Buildings and structures in Lucknow